Kévin Rocheteau (born 10 July 1993) is a French professional footballer who plays as an attacking midfielder for  club Niort.

Career
Born in Royan, Rocheteau joined the youth team at Niort in 2009 and later played for the reserve side in the Division d'Honneur before turning professional in 2013. He was awarded his first professional contract at Chamois Niortais in the summer of 2013 after progressing through the club's youth teams. He made his senior début on 2 August 2013, scoring the Niort goal in a 1–1 draw with Troyes, seven minutes after coming on as a substitute for Jimmy Roye. Rocheteau was handed his first start four days later in the Coupe de la Ligue tie against Le Havre at the Stade René Gaillard. Despite goals from Rocheteau and débutant Florian Martin, Niort were beaten 2–3. On 9 August 2013 he scored his third goal in three matches, netting a late equaliser after again coming on as a substitute in the 1–1 draw away at Tours.

On 23 May 2022, Rocheteau agreed to return to Niort on a two-year contract.

Career statistics

References

External links
 
 

1993 births
Living people
People from Royan
French footballers
Association football forwards
Chamois Niortais F.C. players
Les Herbiers VF players
SO Cholet players
USL Dunkerque players
Ligue 2 players
Championnat National players
Sportspeople from Charente-Maritime
Footballers from Nouvelle-Aquitaine